Mick Burrs (April 1940 – April 20, 2021) was a Canadian poet who lived in Toronto, Ontario. He was born and raised in California, and after leaving the United States to avoid the Vietnam War, he spent much of his life in Yorkton, Saskatchewan. He won the 1998 Saskatchewan Book Award for Poetry for a volume of his collected works, Variations on the Birth of Jacob. This book was published under his birth name, Steven Michael Berzensky, as was a comprehensive collection of his poetry, The Names Leave the Stones: Poems New and Selected (2001 Canada, 2002 United States). He was the former editor of Grain magazine. He died on April 20, 2021, at the age of 81 just 10 days after his birthday.

Works
 1973: Children on the Edge of Space  
 1975: Game Farm: Poems for Intereflection 1967-1975 Limited to 500 Copies.
 1976: Moving in from Paradise
 1982: The Waking Image Bedside Companion 
 1983: The Blue Pools of Paradise
 1993: Dark Halo
 1997: Variations on the Birth of Jacob
 2001: The Names Leave the Stones: Poems New and Selected (Coteau Books),

References

20th-century Canadian poets
20th-century Canadian male writers
Canadian male poets
People from Yorkton
1940 births
2021 deaths
American emigrants to Canada